Jean-Benoît Dunckel (born 7 September 1969) is a French musician best known for being one half of the French music duo Air, along with Nicolas Godin.

In the 1980s, he formed the band Orange with Alex Gopher, Xavier Jamaux and Jean de Reydellet. He studied mathematics and physics and taught at a middle school in Paris, before embarking on a career as a professional musician. Since 1995, he has been one of two members of the band Air, along with his partner Nicolas Godin.

Working under the name Darkel, he released his first solo album, titled Darkel, in September 2006.

In 2011, he formed the electronica side project Tomorrow's World with Lou Hayter of New Young Pony Club. Tomorrow's World, their first album, was released in 2013.

Dunckel collaborated with Icelander Barði Jóhannsson under the name Starwalker and released an EP in March 2014, featuring "Losers Can Win" and "Bad Weather". A new song not featured on the EP was issued in November 2014, titled Blue Hawaii. In April 2016, a self-titled, full-length album was released.

In March 2015, he issued the four-track mini-album titled The Man of Sorrow. Also in 2015, he composed the soundtrack for the film The Summer of Sangailé. The soundtrack album was released on 24 July.

In 2018, he released his 2nd full-length solo album titled H+ under Jive Epic records.

Four years later, in June 2022, Dunckel released his next full-length studio album Carbon, under his own label Prototyp. On the album (theme) Dunckel suggests technology could save the world. AllMusic gave the album in its review 3,5 (out of 5) stars. About the album title Carbon, Dunckel said: “When you burn it, it doesnʼt go away, Itʼs full of strength - diamonds are crystallized carbon. Carbon is the thing that makes you solid. Itʼs the most important thing in our bodies and in our lives, but weʼre hardly aware of it.”

References

External links
Starwalker page
Tumblr page

1969 births
Living people
People from Versailles
French film score composers
French songwriters
Male songwriters
Chevaliers of the Ordre des Arts et des Lettres